Edward Ryan is the name of:
Edward John Francis Ryan (1890–1941), World War I Victoria Cross recipient
Edward George Ryan (1810–1880), Wisconsin Supreme Court Justice
Edward Ryan (barrister) (1793–1875), judge in India and First Civil Service Commissioner
Edward Ryan (actor) (born 1923), American actor in The Fighting Sullivans
Edward Ryan (Red Cross) (1883–1923), American Red Cross official
Edward Thomas Ryan (born 1962), American bacteriologist and epidemiologist
Edward J. Ryan, American football player and coach
Edward Francis Ryan (1879–1956), American prelate of the Roman Catholic Church
Ed Ryan (American football) (1925–2002), player for the Pittsburgh Steelers
Ed Ryan (Australian footballer) (1902–1975), Australian rules footballer for Fitzroy
Ed Ryan (hurler), played for Tipperary in the late 19th century and won the All-Ireland Senior Hurling Championship medal

See also
Ted Ryan (disambiguation)